Kabudan may refer to:
 Kabudan Island in Lake Urmia, Iran
 Kabudan, East Azerbaijan
 Kabudan, Kerman
 Kabudan, Khuzestan
 Kabudan, Razavi Khorasan
 Kabudan, South Khorasan
 Kaboodan, in South Khorasan Province